The N13 road is a national highway (Route nationale) in Morocco linking Taouz near Merzouga close to the Algerian border  with Azrou, Meknes and other northern locations.  North of Meknes there are views of the Zerhoun Mountains and along the N13 is the ancient Roman and Carthaginian settlement of Volubilis, the westernmost provincial capital of the Roman Empire.  This Roman city overlies one of the earliest archaeologically recorded Neolithic settlements in Morocco.

See also
Barbary ape

References

Roads in Morocco